Hisonotus hungy is a species of catfish in the family Loricariidae. It is native to South America, where it occurs in the arroyo of Tirica, which is part of the Paraná River basin in Misiones, Argentina. It is found in vegetated parts of Tirica (including those populated with introduced conifers as well as those with native vegetation) and reaches 4.2 cm (1.7 inches) SL.

References 

Otothyrinae
Fish described in 2007